The 2009 Nordic Trophy (Swedish tournament) was the Swedish edition of the 2009 Nordic Trophy ice hockey tournament, played between August 7 and August 29, 2009. The final weekend was played in Mariehamn, Åland Islands, Finland, at the Islandia.

This year, the Finnish teams dropped out and formed their own Finnish edition of the 2009 Nordic Trophy. Djurgårdens IF defeated defending champions Linköpings HC in the final with a score of 4–1. Andreas Engqvist, Djurgården became the best player of the tournament while Jacob Josefson, also Djurgården, scored most points.

Group stage 
The group stage matches were played at different small town venues in Sweden. HV71 clinched the first place for the first time since the tournament's inauguration.

Playoffs 
The 2009 Nordic Trophy playoffs were played from August 28 to August 30 in Mariehamn, Åland Islands, Finland, at the Islandia. The four best teams from the group stage played in the semi-finals and final, and the two lowest ranked teams played in the fifth-placed game.

Playoff bracket

Final standings

Statistics

External links 
 Official site

2009
Nor